Mammad Hamid oghlu Alakbarov (1899 — February 7, 1959) was an Azerbaijani-Soviet statesman and pedagogue, the first Minister of Culture of Azerbaijan (1953–1955), Deputy Chairman of the Council of Ministers of the Azerbaijan SSR (1952–1953), Minister of Education of the Azerbaijan SSR (1947–1952).

Biography 
Mammad Alakbarov was born in 1899 in Lankaran. After the death of his father Mashadi Hamid in 1909, he lived under the care of his relatives, studied at the "Behjat" Russian-Tatar (Azerbaijani) school in Lankaran, but was unable to complete his education.

Until 1920, he worked in his cousin's fish farm. After the establishment of the Soviet government in Azerbaijan, he was sent to the 1st grade school in Astrakhan-Bazar as a teacher after completing a teacher training course. In 1921, he started working at school No. 5 in Lankaran. Mammad Alakbarov studied at the Pedagogical Institute in Baku in 1923-1926, and as a specialist with higher education he taught in Balaxanı, Bashkechid region of Borchaly Uyezd. He worked as the head of the Public Education Department of Guba district.

In 1928, Mammad Alakbarov worked in the Office of the People's Commissariat of Education of the Azerbaijan SSR, and worked as methodist, responsible executive, deputy head of the department of primary and secondary schools. In 1937 he was a researcher at the Azerbaijan State Institute of Scientific Research Schools, at the same time in 1939 he worked as a deputy director of the Institute of Teacher Training, and in 1941 he was transferred to this position.

Mammad Alakbarov, who was admitted to the CPSU in 1943, has been the director of the Azerbaijan State Pedagogical Institute since that year, and the deputy commissioner of public education of the Azerbaijan SSR since 1944. In 1947, he was appointed Minister of Public Education of the Azerbaijan SSR, held this position for five years, and then served as Deputy Chairman of the Council of Ministers of the Azerbaijan SSR. From 1953 he was the Minister of Culture of the Azerbaijan SSR.

Mammad Alakbarov received the degree of Candidate of Philological Sciences in 1950, was the author of articles on the methods of teaching the Azerbaijani language and literature. His books "Writing in incomplete secondary and high schools" (1940), "Methods of reading in primary school" (1940) and others were published.

Mammad Alakbarov was repeatedly elected a member of the Central Committee of the Communist Party of Azerbaijan, a deputy of the second and fourth convocations of the Supreme Soviet of the Azerbaijan SSR. He was awarded the honorary title of "Honored School Teacher of the Azerbaijan SSR", was awarded the Order of the Red Banner of Labour and medals.

Mammad Alakbarov died on February 7, 1959, after a long and serious illness.

References 

1899 births
1959 deaths
Azerbaijan Communist Party (1920) politicians
Azerbaijan State Pedagogical University alumni
Recipients of the Order of the Red Banner of Labour
Education ministers of Azerbaijan
Azerbaijani educators
People from Lankaran